A masquerade is a trope found in speculative fiction, in which a group of supernatural or otherwise extraordinary people hide their existence from the mainstream society in the given setting. The term was first coined by Robert A. Heinlein's Methuselah's Children in 1958. Those hidden groups may form a wainscot society, wherein they live adjacent to mainstream society in a covert manner, but overall remain their own distinct entity with their own culture.

In a fantasy context, it means that magic is hidden, whether in secret locations, such as Diagon Alley in Harry Potter, or by magical forces, such as the Mist in Percy Jackson, or a glamour placed on individuals.

That is typically done to avoid some type of mass panic that would result in the destruction of the magical world by far more numerous normal people fearing the unknown. Masquerade societies may seek to hide this information from outsiders, or they may be disbelieved due to ignorance, conspiracies, or consensus reality. In works of fantasy with horror aspects, such as H. P. Lovecraft's Cthulhu Mythos, the Buffyverse, or White Wolf Games' World of Darkness setting, the majority's ignorance of the fantastical elements of their world will be portrayed as being to their own benefit.

The trope is used not only in fantasy but also in science fiction and superhero stories. A common device to keep hidden events from the masses in science fiction is the existence of aliens, such as in the Men in Black series. The secret identities of superheroes are also a type of masquerade, and the only superheroes that show their true identity are ones who can keep their family safe or have nothing to protect.

The masquerade trope assists writers by adding additional tension to the story, as well as helping the story appear plausible. It also saves the author from needing to write an alternate history in order to explain the existence of magic.

Examples 
 Masquerade society from Vampire: The Masquerade
 Harry Potter series by J.K. Rowling
 The Borrowers by Mary Norton
 Neverwhere by Neil Gaiman (Gaiman's works often make use of "wainscotting")
 Little, Big by John Crowley
 Most of the work of Tim Powers
 The Highlander series
 The Dresden Files by Jim Butcher
 Percy Jackson and the Olympians series by Rick Riordan
 The Littles by John Peterson
 Skulduggery Pleasant by Derek Landy
 The Magicians by Lev Grossman
 That Hideous Strength by C.S. Lewis
 The Underland Chronicles by Suzanne Collins

See also
 Modern fantasy
 Secret history
 Kayfabe: the equivalent term in circuses, carnivals, and professional wrestling

References

 
Fantasy tropes